Senate elections were held in Cambodia on 25 February 2018 after being postponed from 14 January 2018. For the first time, the Senate and parliamentary elections occurred in the same year. The result was a victory for the CPP, which won all 58 seats. King Norodom Sihamoni nominated Princess Norodom Arunrasmy and Oum Somanin to the Senate.

Results

References

Senate
Cambodia
Elections in Cambodia